The Slieve Felim way is a long-distance trail through the Slieve Felim Mountains in Ireland. It is typically completed in two days. It is designated as a National Waymarked Trail by the National Trails Office of the Irish Sports Council and is managed by Shannon Development and Coillte. 

The trail begins in the village of Murroe and follows the road past Glenstal Abbey before crossing forestry along the slopes of the Slieve Felim Mountains to reach the village of Toor. From Toor, the Way crosses the flanks of Keeper Hill in the Silvermine Mountains before following the road into Silvermines village. 

A review of the National Waymarked Trails in 2010 found multiday and day usage of the trail to be low and recommended a review and strengthening of the trail management structures.

References

Notes

Bibliography

External links
 Slieve Felim Way at IrishTrails.ie

Long-distance trails in the Republic of Ireland
Geography of County Limerick
Geography of County Tipperary
Tourist attractions in County Limerick
Tourist attractions in County Tipperary